is an OVA series which takes place in between episodes 8 and 9 of the first season of Hakuoki, with each episode being told from six different characters' perspective.
It is produced by Studio Deen under the same staff and cast.

The opening song is "Yume no Ukifune" by Aika Yoshioka and the ending theme is "Mugen ~A True Love Tale~" for episode 1, "Kazahana - The Whisper of the Snow Falling -" for episode 2, "Araragi - The End of Struggle -" for episode 3, "Hikari - I Promise You -" for episode 4, "Shinjitsu - The Light Lasting -" for episode 5, and "Hiyoku - Contract With You -" for episode 6.

Episode list

References

Hakuoki episode lists